Ryedale District Council in North Yorkshire, England is elected every four years. Since the last boundary changes in 2003, 30 councillors have been elected from 20 wards.

Political control
Since the foundation of the council in 1973 political control of the council has been held by the following parties:

Leadership
Ryedale operates on a committee system, and decides at each annual meeting whether to appoint a leader of the council that year or not. When no leader is appointed, political leadership is exercised by the chair of the policy and resources committee. (The role of chair of the council is largely ceremonial.) Since 2007, the leaders, or chairs of the policy and resources committee when no there is no leader, have been:

Council elections
1973 Ryedale District Council election
1976 Ryedale District Council election
1979 Ryedale District Council election
1983 Ryedale District Council election (New ward boundaries)
1987 Ryedale District Council election
1991 Ryedale District Council election
1995 Ryedale District Council election
1999 Ryedale District Council election
2003 Ryedale District Council election (New ward boundaries increased the number of seats by 7)
2007 Ryedale District Council election
2011 Ryedale District Council election
2015 Ryedale District Council election
2019 Ryedale District Council election

By-election results

2003-2007

2007-2011

2015-2019

2019-2023

References

By-election results

External links
Ryedale District Council

 
Ryedale
Council elections in North Yorkshire
District council elections in England